Ray Mudjahid Ponce Millan better known as Kublai Millan or Kublai is a prolific artist from Mindanao. He is known for his giant sculptures. Aside from being a sculptor he is also an art photographer, painter, digital artist and performance artist.

History
Kublai was born on April 9, 1974, in Cotabato City. Kublai started his career when he made  all the artworks both inside and outside of his family's hotel Ponce Suites in Davao City, which is managed by his mother. He studied Fine Arts at the University of the Philippines Diliman. After graduation,  he returned to Davao City, painting and sculpting subjects relating to the culture of his hometown.

His two giant works are "Kampilan" in Sultan Kudarat, Maguindanao province, and the "Risen Christ" in a church in Tagum City. He also created the giant durian monument at the Francisco Bangoy International Airport, the giant eagle and Bagobo children inside the People's Park, Davao City.

References

1974 births
Filipino sculptors
Filipino painters
People from Cotabato City
Living people
21st-century Filipino sculptors
20th-century Filipino sculptors
Filipino Muslims